Lieutenant General Naveen Chand Rawlley, PVSM, AVSM, MC (15 August 1919 – 1 November 2004) was a General Officer in the Indian Army. He served as the General Officer Commanding-in-Chief Eastern Command before taking over as the 5th Vice Chief of the Army Staff.

Early life
Rawlley was born on 15 August 1919. He attended the Bishop Cotton School in Shimla. He was also educated at Bombay subsequently.

Military career

World War II
Rawlley graduated from the Indian Military Academy and 1941 was commissioned into the 9th Battalion the 12th Frontier Force Regiment on 15 May. In 1943, the battalion moved to Burma and saw action in the Burma Campaign. He was awarded the Military Cross during the Battle of Kohima. He commanded his battalion during the Battle of Imphal. He then attended the Staff College, Quetta in 1945. After the year-long staff course, he was posted to the 25th Infantry Division. As part of Operation Zipper, the division was chosen for the invasion of British Malaya in an amphibious role. Although hostilities ceased, the operation proceeded as planned and 25th Division was the first formation to land in Malaya, occupying the capital, Kuala Lumpur, and then accepting the surrender of the Japanese Army. Rawlley was mentioned in dispatches for distinguished service in British Malaya.

Post-Independence
After Independence and the ensuing Partition of India, he opted to join the Indian Army. With the creation of the Brigade of the Guards in 1949, he was assigned to this regiment. He attended the United States Army Command and General Staff College in Fort Leavenworth, Kansas. He served as the directing staff at the Defence Services Staff College, Wellington for a period of three years.
He led the Indian Army team of officers which helped set up the Haile Selassie Military Academy in Harar, Ethiopia. After the academy was set up, he served as the first Commandant of the Academy. For his outstanding services, the Emperor of Ethiopia, Haile Selassie made Rawlley a Grand officer of the Order of the Star of Ethiopia.

In 1961, he returned to India and took command of the 11th Infantry Brigade. He was awarded the Ati Vishisht Seva Medal (then called Vishisht Seva Medal Class II) in January 1962. During the Sino-Indian War, the brigade fought well in Walong in the Lohit division of the then North-East Frontier Agency. The Battle of Walong was the only counterattack of the war.

Rawlley was appointed Commandant of the Infantry School in Mhow in 1963. After a shirt stint, he was selected to attended the Imperial Defence College in the United Kingdom. On 1 January 1964, he became the first Colonel of the Regiment of the Brigade of the Guards. Until then the Colonel was the Chief of the Army Staff. After the year-long course, he returned to India and was appointed Director of Military Operations (DMO) at Army headquarters. This appointment was later upgraded to Major General and then to Lieutenant General, and is now termed Director General Military Operations (DGMO).

General Officer
In May 1965, Rawlley was promoted to the rank of Major General and appointed General Officer Commanding 11th Infantry Division. The division fought in the Rajasthan front during the Indo-Pakistani War of 1965. He took over as the Director of Military training (DMT) at Army HQ in 1969. In January 1970, he was awarded the Param Vishisht Seva Medal for distinguished service of the highest order.

Rawlley was promoted to Lieutenant General in August 1970. He took command of the XI Corps in Jalandhar. In November 1970, he received the salute at the passing out parade of the Haile Selassie Military Academy in Ethiopia. As the first Commandant of the academy, he was a special guest of the Government of Ethiopia.
He commanded the corps as part of the Western Command during the Indo-Pakistani War of 1971. In June 1972, he moved to Army HQ as the Quarter Master General (QMG). Rawlley was promoted to the Army Commander grade on 22 January 1973 and was appointed the next General Officer Commanding-in-Chief (GOC-in-C) Eastern Command. He succeeded Lieutenant General Jagjit Singh Aurora and took over as GOC-in-C Eastern Command at Fort William, Calcutta in February.

On 1 August 1974, Rawlley assumed office of the Vice Chief of the Army Staff from lieutenant General M L Thapan. In March 1975, the Government of India decided to appoint Lieutenant General Tapishwar Narain Raina the next Chief of the Army Staff superseding Rawlley. Rawlley was the senior-most Lieutenant General in the Army in May 1975, when General Gopal Gurunath Bewoor retired.

Personal life
Rawlley was married to Sita Rawlley, a well-known golfer. Called the leading light of Indian Women's golf, she won the Ladies All India Amateur Golf championship three time consecutively from 1976 to 1978. Sita was awarded the Arjuna Award in 1977. She represented India on multiple occasions, both as a player and an official. She was a member of the Indian team which participated in the Queen Sirikit Cup in 1981 and 1983.

Rawlley passed away on 1 November 2004. He was cremated with full military honours.

Dates of rank

See also
 Indo-Pakistani War of 1971
 Sino-Indian War

Notes

References

Bibliography

1919 births
2004 deaths
Military personnel from Punjab, India
Indian military personnel of the Indo-Pakistani War of 1971
Generals of the Indo-Pakistani War of 1971
Indian generals
Punjabi people
Vice Chiefs of Army Staff (India)
British Indian Army officers
Indian Army personnel of World War II
Recipients of the Param Vishisht Seva Medal
Recipients of the Ati Vishisht Seva Medal
Indian recipients of the Military Cross
Bishop Cotton School Shimla alumni
Academic staff of the Defence Services Staff College
Recipients of orders, decorations, and medals of Ethiopia